The XXV Winter Universiade, took place in Erzurum, Turkey between 27 January to 6 February. Located in Eastern Anatolia Region, it is a city on the traditional silk road and has been governed by many cultures over the centuries. The Erzurum Ice Hockey Arena, located on the Cemal Gürsel Sports Campus, was newly built with an ice rink of 60m x 30m and 3,000 seats for spectators.

Venues
Snow disciplines

Four ski lifts serve six race courses for slalom, giant slalom and Super Giant slalom events.

It hosts snowboarding and freestyle skiing competitions.

The Kiremitlik Hill Ski Jumping Facility is situated north of Palandöken Ski Resort and south of the athletes' village. It consists of two jumping towers and two take-off ramps for large hill (K125) and normal hill (K95) competitions, as well as three more ramps (K65, K40 and K20) for training.

Ice disciplines
The Erzurum Ice Skating Arena, opened in March 2009, is a  indoor ice rink situated in Palandöken neighborhood of Erzurum. The arena, having a seating capacity of 2000, hosts short-track speed skating and figure skating events.

The newly built Erzurum Universiade Ice Arena consists of two ice rinks of  different in audience capacity. The men's ice hockey matches are played in the 3000 ice rink and the women's matches in the 500 ice rink.

The Milli Piyango Curling Arena is an indoor ice rink consisting of five curling sheets. Opened in September 2010, it has a seating capacity of 1,000 people.

Sports
Freestyling Skiing, Nordic Combined and Ski Jumping are the optional sports.

Numbers in parentheses indicate the number of medal events contested in each sport.

  Alpine skiing (8)
  Biathlon (9)
  Cross-country skiing (11)
  Curling (2)
  Figure skating (5)
  Freestyle skiing (4)
  Ice hockey (2)
  Nordic combined (3)
  Short track speed skating (8)
  Ski jumping (4)
  Snowboarding (6)

Participants

Following is a list of nations that were sent invitations to attend the Universiade: Malaysia and Venezuela made their debuts. Syria was on the entry list but later withdrew; this would have marked Syria's debut. With 58 nations competing, it represented the largest amount of nations ever to compete, and increase of 8 from the previous high at the 2005 games in Innsbruck. A total of 1880 athletes and 849 officials participated in the Universiade. Moldova, Thailand, and San Marino who were present at the 2009 Winter Universiade in Harbin did not send athletes to the games.

Medal table
The host nation, Turkey, is highlighted in lavender blue.

Schedule

References

External links
 Universiade Erzurum 2011
 Promotional video for the City/Games

 
Multi-sport events in Turkey
International sports competitions hosted by Turkey
2011 in Turkish sport
Sport in Erzurum
Winter World University Games
Winter Universiade
January 2011 sports events in Turkey
February 2011 sports events in Turkey
Winter sports competitions in Turkey